The Liujiaxia Reservoir is a reservoir in China's Gansu Province, formed by the Liujiaxia Dam on the Yellow River. The reservoir's shores belong to the prefecture's Yongjing County (the narrow northern part, and the north shore of the wide southern part), Dongxiang Autonomous County (eastern part of the south shore), Linxia County (western part of the south shore), and Jishishan Bonan, Dongxiang and Salar Autonomous County (the small westernmost section of the south shore).

The Daxia River and the Tao River flow into the reservoirs, forming wide bays.

This silting rate is considered quite low, compared to other reservoirs on the Yellow River, such as the narrow Yanguoxia Reservoir just downstream, which lost 71.3% of its storage capacity between 1958 and 1964 (and 77%, by 1965), or Sanmenxia Reservoir, which lost 96% of its storage capacity to sedimentation in just 4 years.

The reservoir usually does not freeze over in winter, but during the unusually cold weather in early 2008 over half of its surface froze, which necessitated taking measures to protect the turbines of the hydroelectric plant from floating ice.

A variety of watercraft operate on the reservoir. Vehicle ferries run frequently across the reservoir between docks in Linxia County (Lianhua Tai) and Yongjing County. Recreational vessels and shuttle boats to  Bingling Temple operate from a number of docks, in particular the one in Liujiaxia Town near the dam.

See also 

 Liujiaxia Dam

References 

Yellow River
Reservoirs in China
Bodies of water of Gansu
Linxia Hui Autonomous Prefecture